Crusoe the Dachshund is a thirteen-year-old, miniature black and tan dachshund living in Ottawa, Ontario, Canada who gained internet fame for his homemade costumes and viral videos. He plays characters including chef, superhero, captain, fisherman, golfer, hockey player, and accountant.

History 
Crusoe began appearing on social media with the self-appointed title of “celebrity” as a sarcastic moniker. After starting on social media in 2011, Crusoe has gained over 4 million followers.

Crusoe published "Crusoe the Celebrity Dachshund: Adventures of the Wiener Dog Extraordinaire", a New York Times Bestselling book. In 2018, he published his second book, "Crusoe, the Worldly Wiener Dog: Further Adventures with the Celebrity Dachshund".
Siblings: Oakley, Daphne and Delilah

Crusoe won Best Animal category at the Shorty Awards and the 2018 People’s Choice Award for Animal Star, leading to him being branded an “internet celebrity”.

Crusoe underwent emergency surgery in August 2016 for a ruptured disc in his spinal cord, a condition called IVDD, or Intervertebral Disc Disease, a common condition for Dachshunds. His recovery was successful and as of August 2017, he was declared healthy.

In 2017, Crusoe started a Facebook series documenting his own life, with 5 seasons total as of 2021. Alongside his half-brother Oakley, he received a shaded cream longhaired dachshund puppy sister named Daphne, who had celebrated her birthday on May 8th 2021 turning 2. Crusoe is primarily voiced by computer scientist & voice actor, Chuck Gaffney while the rest of the animal characters featured are by currently uncredited actors. A few shorts are primarily voiceless. The series also has been posted on YouTube. 

In late July 2020, Crusoe had his gallbladder surgically removed. Following this, a recovery of 4 months occurred, with persistent updates. In March of 2021, Crusoe had been feeling better, with his health improving.

In March 2022, a bubble shooter-styled game featuring cast members from Crusoe's web series was released to the public. The characters are voiced by the same actors portraying them in the series, and is themed around the dog characters.

Crusoe once again had surgery in May 2022 after he again ruptured a disc in his spinal cord, and is currently undergoing recovery.

In January 2023, Crusoe received a half-sister, a brown longhaired dachshund puppy named Delilah. She lives with Oakley as his younger sister.

Social media 
Crusoe has over 3 million Facebook Likes and over a billion total video views, 700,000 Instagram followers, and over 1,000,000 subscribers to his YouTube Channel with over 150 million channel views. Crusoe was present on Vine with over 10 billion loops. As of 2020, his TikTok profile has over 10 million views.

Press appearances 
Crusoe has appeared on such media outlets as Good Morning America, Mashable, New York Mag, Buzzfeed, NHL.com, and ESPN. His travels have been covered by Metro, Lonely Planet, and HuffPost. Crusoe also attended the 2018 People’s Choice Awards in Los Angeles.

An online advertisement for GoPro and a television commercial for the Recreational Boating & Fishing Foundation both featured clips of Crusoe fishing. Crusoe was also the face of the Heinz Wiener Stampede Super Bowl ad campaign in 2016.

References 

Canadian Internet celebrities
2009 animal births
Animals on the Internet